Hypopyra allardi is a moth of the family Erebidae. It is found in the Democratic Republic of Congo, Ghana, Madagascar, Sierra Leone and Tanzania (Zanzibar).

References

Moths described in 1878
Hypopyra
Moths of Africa
Taxa named by Charles Oberthür